Franciscan monastery St. Catharine, in Kreševo, Bosnia and Herzegovina, has been established between 1521 and 1524. The monastery has been serving its community for centuries, and the Catholic traditions here are very strong.

National monument and heritage
The monastery has a rustic museum, library and gallery. The monastery as an architectural ensemble, together with a number of its movable property and items, is being included into the List of National Monuments of Bosnia and Herzegovina since 2003.

Notables

A memorial chamber dedicated to Fra Grga Martić was created after his death within the monastery. 

Famous student of the seminary in Kreševo include Albanian poet Gjergj Fishta.

See also
 Franciscan Province of Bosna Srebrena

References

External links

 
 Fojnica – samostan i župa Svetoga Duha 

Kreševo
Christian monasteries established in the 16th century
Religious buildings and structures completed in 1524
1524 establishments in the Ottoman Empire